McDowell or MacDowell is a Scottish surname, derived from the Gaelic Mac Dubhghaill, meaning "son of Dubhghall" (i.e. of the same origin as McDougall).

People

McDowell
Abram Irvin McDowell (1793–1844), mayor of Columbus, Ohio
Alex McDowell (born 1955), British narrative designer
Alexander McDowell (1845–1913), congressman from Pennsylvania
Andrew McDowell (born 1971), Irish economist
Anne Elizabeth McDowell (1826–1901), American newspaper editor
Charles S. McDowell (1871–1943), interim governor of Alabama
Charles T. McDowell (born 1921), American academic and military officer
Charlie McDowell (born 1983), American film director and writer
Derek McDowell (born 1958), Irish politician
Ephraim McDowell (1771–1830), American physician
Fred McDowell (1904–1972), American blues singer and guitar player
Graeme McDowell (born 1979), Northern Irish professional golfer
Hugh McDowell (1953–2018), English cellist, member of Electric Light Orchestra
Irvin McDowell (1818–1885), Union army general
Jack McDowell (born 1960), former Major League Baseball pitcher
Jack McDowell (born ), Northern Irish political activist
James McDowell (1795–1851), politician from Virginia
James F. McDowell (1825-887), politician from Indiana
James F. McDowell (Wisconsin politician) (born 1862), politician from Wisconsin
John McDowell (born 1942), South African philosopher
Johnny McDowell (1915–1952), American Formula One driver
Joseph "Pleasant Gardens" McDowell (1758–1795), American statesman from North Carolina
Joseph McDowell Jr. (1756–1801), American statesman
Joseph J. McDowell (1800–1877), U.S. Congressman from Ohio
Joseph Nash McDowell (1805–1868), American doctor
Josh McDowell (born 1939), American Christian apologist and author
Kelly McDowell (born circa 1953), mayor of El Segundo, California
Linda McDowell (born 1949), British geographer
Louise Sherwood McDowell (1876–1966), American physicist 
Malik McDowell (born 1996), American football player
Malcolm McDowell (born 1943), English actor
Mark McDowell (born 1962), Canadian diplomat 
Marty McDowell (born 1987), New Zealand canoeist
Mary Dagen McDowell (born 1969), American news anchor and analyst
Matthew McDowell (died 1944), Scottish Steamboat owner and builder
Michael McDowell (actor) (born 1964), Northern Irish actor
Michael McDowell (author) (1950–1999), American novelist and screenwriter
Michael McDowell (politician) (born 1951), barrister and former Irish politician
Michael McDowell (racing driver) (born 1984), American race car driver
Michael P. Kube-McDowell  (born 1954), American science fiction writer
Oddibe McDowell (born 1962), former Major League Baseball 
Paul McDowell (1905–1962), American rower
Paul McDowell (1931–2016), English actor and screenwriter
Robert H. McDowell (1894–1980), American historian and intelligence officer
Robert M. McDowell (born 1963), former U.S. Federal Communications Commissioner
Roger McDowell (born 1960), Major League baseball player and coach
R. B. McDowell (1913–2011), Professor Emeritus of History, Trinity College Dublin
Sam McDowell (born 1942), Major League baseball pitcher
Samuel McDowell (1735–1817), American soldier and politician, father of Dr. Ephraim McDowell
Thomas McDowell (born 1977), convicted murderer
Thomas Bleakley McDowell (1923–2009), British soldier
William McDowell (born 1976), American gospel musician
William Fraser McDowell (1858–1937), American Bishop of the Methodist Episcopal Church
William Osborn McDowell (1848–1927), American businessman

MacDowell
Andie MacDowell (born 1958), American film actress
Douglas MacDowell (1931–2010), British classical scholar
Edward MacDowell (1860–1908), American composer
Harold MacDowell, American construction company executive
João MacDowell, Brazilian musician
Louis G. MacDowell (died 1986), American USDA researcher
Marian MacDowell (1857–1956), American pianist
Patrick MacDowell (1799–1870), Irish sculptor
Samuel Wallace MacDowell (1846–1908), Brazilian military man, magistrate, politician and journalist
Thain Wendell MacDowell (1890–1960), Canadian Victoria Cross recipient

Fictional
Evangeline A.K. MacDowell, a fictional character from Negima! manga series
Billy MacDowell, a fictional character in the Alice 19th manga

See also
McDowell Lee (1925–2014), American politician
Mike MacDowel (born 1932) British racecar driver
Clan Macdowall
McDowell (disambiguation)

Surnames of British Isles origin
Surnames of Scottish origin
Anglicised Scottish Gaelic-language surnames
Patronymic surnames
Surnames from given names